Seol Min-kyung (born 17 November 1960) is a South Korean former tennis player.

Biography
From 1981 to 1985, Seol played in 12 ties for the South Korea Federation Cup team. All of her matches were in singles and included wins over Sabrina Goleš of Yugoslavia and Catherine Suire of France.

Seol was a member of the gold medal winning South Korea team at 1982 Asian Games in New Delhi. Her son Jae-gyun Hwang, a professional baseball player formerly with the San Francisco Giants, won an Asian Games gold with the national team in 2014, making them the country's first mother-son combination to win a gold at the Asian Games.

References

External links
 
 
 

1960 births
Living people
South Korean female tennis players
Asian Games gold medalists for South Korea
Asian Games medalists in tennis
Medalists at the 1982 Asian Games
Tennis players at the 1982 Asian Games
20th-century South Korean women